Zulia may refer to:

Places

Colombia
 El Zulia, a municipality in the department of Norte de Santander
 Zulia River, a river on the border with Venezuela

Venezuela
 Zulia, one of the 23 states which make up the country
 Zulia Canton, a former canton of Gran Colombia
 Zulia Department, a former department of Gran Colombia
 Zulian Region, a development region consisting of the state of Zulia
 Zulia River, a river on the border with Colombia

Elsewhere
 Mount Zulia, Uganda

People
 Zulia Calatayud (born 1979), Cuban middle-distance runner
 Zulia Menjívar (born 1992), Salvadoran footballer

Other uses
 University of Zulia, Maracaibo, Venezuela
 Diocese of Zulia, a Venezuelan diocese in the Roman Catholic Archdiocese of Maracaibo
 ARV Zulia (D-21), a Venezuelan Navy destroyer
 Zulia Fútbol Club, a Venezuelan football club

See also 
 Zulia toad-headed sideneck, a turtle species
 Manuel Zelaya, (born 1952), Honduran politician

Feminine given names